The Lookout Air Raids were minor but historic Japanese air raids that occurred in the mountains of Oregon, several miles outside Brookings during World War II. 

On September 9, 1942, a Japanese Yokosuka E14Y Glen floatplane, launched from a Japanese submarine, dropped two incendiary bombs with the intention of starting a forest fire. However, with the efforts of a patrol of fire lookouts  and weather conditions not amenable to a fire, the damage done by the attack was minor. The attack was the first time the contiguous United States was bombed by an enemy aircraft.  It was also the second time the continental United States was attacked by enemy aircraft during World War II, the first being the bombing of Dutch Harbor three months earlier.

Lookout Air Raids
On Wednesday morning, September 9, 1942, the submarine I-25, under the command of Lieutenant Commander Akiji Tagami, surfaced west of Cape Blanco. The submarine launched a "Glen" Yokosuka E14Y floatplane, flown by Warrant Officer Nobuo Fujita and Petty Officer Okuda Shoji, with a load of two incendiary bombs of  each.

Howard "Razz" Gardner spotted and reported the incoming "Glen" from his fire lookout tower on Mount Emily in the Siskiyou National Forest.

Although Razz did not see the bombing, he saw the smoke plume and reported the fire to the dispatch office. He was instructed to hike to the fire to see what suppression he could do. Dispatch also sent USFS Fire Lookout Keith V. Johnson from the nearby Bear Wallow Lookout Tower. Fujita dropped two bombs, one on Wheeler Ridge on Mount Emily in Oregon. The location of the other bomb is unknown. The Wheeler Ridge bomb started a small fire  due east of Brookings.

The two men proceeded to the location and were able to keep the fire under control. Only a few small scattered fires were started because the bombs were not dropped from the correct height. The men stayed on scene and worked through the night keeping the fires contained. In the morning, a fire crew arrived to help.  A recent rain storm had kept the area wet, which helped the fire lookouts contain the blaze.

Aftermath
A full investigation was launched by the Federal Bureau of Investigation, which resulted in locating several bomb fragments. The story was reported in several newspapers on September 10, 1942.  Lieut. Gen. John L. DeWitt, the area commander announced,  The Western Defense Command is investigating the circumstances surrounding the discovery on Sept. 9 of fragments of what appears to have been an incendiary bomb. These fragments were found by personnel of the United States Forestry Service near Mt. Emily nine miles northeast of Brookings, Or. Markings of the bomb fragments indicated that the missile was of Japanese origin.

The floatplane carried two bombs. Both were dropped, according to the Japanese records, but no trace has yet been found of the second bomb. One of the bombs left a foot-deep crater. Fujita and his observer made a second attack on September 29, again causing only negligible damage.

Postwar
Twenty years later, the floatplane's pilot, Nobuo Fujita, was invited back to Brookings. Before he made the trip the Japanese government was assured he would not be tried as a war criminal. In Brookings, Fujita served as Grand Marshal for the local Azalea Festival. At the festival, Fujita presented his family's 400-year-old samurai sword to the city as a symbol of regret. Fujita made a number of additional visits to Brookings, serving as an "informal ambassador of peace and friendship".  Impressed by his welcome in the United States, in 1985 Fujita invited three students from Brookings to Japan. During the visit of the Brookings-Harbor High School students to Japan, Fujita received a dedicatory letter from an aide of President Ronald Reagan "with admiration for your kindness and generosity". Fujita returned to Brookings in 1990, 1992, and 1995. In 1992 he planted a tree at the bomb site as a gesture of peace. In 1995, he moved the samurai sword from the Brookings City Hall into the new library's display case. He was made an honorary citizen of Brookings several days before his death on September 30, 1997, at the age of 85. In October 1998, his daughter, Yoriko Asakura, buried some of Fujita's ashes at the bomb site.

See also
Amerikabomber
Bombardment of Fort Stevens
Fu-Go balloon bomb
Operation K

Notes

References

External links

 Los Angeles Times news story of September 15, 1942
Trail Dedication at Japanese Bombing Site Set - U.S. Forest Service

1942 in Oregon
Aerial operations and battles of World War II
Airstrikes
American Theater of World War II
Battles and conflicts without fatalities
Conflicts in 1942
Curry County, Oregon
History of Oregon
Rogue River-Siskiyou National Forest
September 1942 events
Japan–United States military relations